3D graphics have become so popular, particularly in video games, that specialized APIs (application programming interfaces) have been created to ease the processes in all stages of computer graphics generation. These APIs have also proved vital to computer graphics hardware manufacturers, as they provide a way for programmers to access the hardware in an abstract way, while still taking advantage of the special hardware of any specific graphics card.

The first 3D graphics framework was probably Core, published by the ACM in 1977.

Low-level 3D API
These APIs for 3D computer graphics are particularly popular:
 Direct3D (a subset of DirectX)
 Glide
 Mantle developed by AMD.
 Metal developed by Apple.
 OptiX 7.0 and Latest developed by NVIDIA.
 OpenGL and the OpenGL Shading Language
 OpenGL ES 3D API for embedded devices
 QuickDraw 3D developed by Apple Computer starting in 1995, abandoned in 1998
 Vulkan
 LibGCM
ANGLE, web browsers graphics engine, a cross-platform version of the OpenGL wrapper for the web

Web-based API
 WebGL is a JavaScript interface for OpenGL-ES-2.x API, promoted by Khronos. This is gaining more interest recently, as this enables web applications to use native graphics.

High-level 3D API
There are also higher-level 3D scene-graph APIs which provide additional functionality on top of the lower-level rendering API. Such libraries under active development include:
 BGFX
 ClanLib
 Crystal Space
 HOOPS 3D Graphics System
 Horde3D
 Irrlicht Engine
 Java 3D
 Java FX
 JMonkey Engine
 JT Open from Siemens Digital Industries Software
 magnum
 Mobile 3D Graphics API (M3G; JSR-184)
 OGRE
 OpenGL Performer
 OpenSceneGraph (now obsolete OSG.JS for WebPlatforms)
 OpenSG
 QSDK
 RAMSES
 RenderWare
 Panda3D
 Zea Engine
 Unigine
 VTK

JavaScript-based engines
There is more interest in web browser based high-level API for 3D graphics engines. Some are:
 A-Frame
 Blend4Web
 CopperLicht
 O3D
 StormEngineC
 Three.js
 Babylon.js
 Verge3D
 X3DOM
 Zea Engine

Flash-based engines
 Stage3D in the 3D library in Flash version 11 and later
 Papervision3D and its fork Away3D for Flash

See also
 Graphics library
 Game engine
 3D computer graphics software

Computing-related lists
 
Lists of software